Centro Cultural Recreativo e Desportivo Burinhosa is a futsal team based in the village of Burinhosa, Portugal, that plays in the Portuguese Futsal First Division.

Current squad

References

External links
 Zerozero

Futsal clubs in Portugal